L. Timmel Duchamp is an American author of science fiction. She is also an editor for Aqueduct Press.

Biography
Duchamp is often grouped together with Kelly Link and other contemporary women authors who use genres like fantasy, horror, and science fiction to explore themes of feminism and gender politics.  Until recently Duchamp's output focused primarily on short stories and critical essays, with publications in anthologies like The Thackery T. Lambshead Pocket Guide to Eccentric & Discredited Diseases and magazines like Asimov's Science Fiction.

Her career has received increased critical and popular interest when her first novel Alanya to Alanya was released in June 2005.  First in a series of five books dubbed the Marq'ssan Cycle, Alanya to Alanya is set on a near-future earth controlled by a male-dominated ruling class patterned loosely after the corporate world of today.  The Marq'ssan, an advanced race of aliens, bring business as usual to a screeching halt all over the world by disabling technology and aiding groups willing to fight for independence from the power structure.  The main character is Kay Zeldin, a history professor who has a history of working for the government.  But as she works for the government she becomes more and more convinced to follow the Marq'ssans.

Selected bibliography
"O's Story". Memories And Visions: Women's Fantasy and Science Fiction. ed. Susanna Sturgis, Crossing Press, 1989 
"Transcendence".  Starshore. Vol.1, no.2, Fall, 1990.
"Things of the Flesh". Asimov's Science Fiction. January, 1994.
"A Portrait of the Artist as a Middle-Aged Woman". Leviathan 2. ed. Jeff VanderMeer and Rose Secrest, Ministry of Whimsy, April, 1998. 
"Motherhood, Etc." Flying Cups and Saucers: Gender Explorations in Science Fiction & Fantasy.  ed. Debbie Notkin & The Secret Feminist Cabal, Edgewood Press, 1998.
"Vestigial Elongation of the Caudal Vertebrae".  The Thackery T. Lambshead Pocket Guide to Eccentric & Discredited Diseases. eds Jeff VanderMeer and Mark Roberts. Nightshade Books, November, 2003)
The Grand Conversation. Aqueduct Press.
Love's Body, Dancing in Time. Aqueduct Press, April, 2004.
Alanya to Alanya: Book One of the Marq'ssan Cycle. Aqueduct Press: June, 2005.
The Red Rose Rages (Bleeding). Aqueduct Press: December 2005.
Renegade: Book Two of the Marq'ssan Cycle.  Aqueduct Press: June 2006.
Tsunami: Book Three of the Marq'ssan Cycle. Aqueduct Press: January 2007.
Never at Home. Aqueduct Press, 2011.  [seven stories]
 Editor: Missing Links and Secret Histories: A Selection of Wikipedia Entries from Across the Known Multiverse. Aqueduct Press: Spring 2013. 
 'Blood in the Fruit: Book Four of the Marq'ssan Cycle. Aqueduct Press: January 2008.
 'Stretto: Book Five of the Marq'ssan Cycle. Aqueduct Press: July 2008.

Awards

 2017 World Fantasy Award for Special Award, Professional for Aqueduct Press

External links
 
 
 Aqueduct Press
 Interview from Emerald City

Year of birth missing (living people)
Living people
21st-century American novelists
American science fiction writers
American women short story writers
American women novelists
Women science fiction and fantasy writers
21st-century American women writers
21st-century American short story writers
American speculative fiction publishers (people)
American speculative fiction editors